UP2U is a British children's television series that aired on BBC1 from 16 July 1988 to 16 September 1989. The programme aired on Saturday mornings and was broadcast live from Manchester; the first series from a dedicated studio (at BBC North West in central Manchester) and the second from the programme's own production office.

The programme featured a mix of entertainment features, location reports, guest interviews and 'things-to-do' guides, with the title "UP2U" referring to the fact that, like in Blue Peter, viewers could write in to suggest subject matter for features and articles, and also vote by telephone during the live show for features, inserts and music videos to be shown.

Each week, two of the presenters would be in the studio/office presenting the bulk of the show, with the third on location providing reports linked into the show at various points.

During one of the location reports, from the Royal Tournament, Anthea Turner was injured when a pyrotechnic display exploded in her face whilst she was giving a piece to camera during a motorcycle stunt. The incident was broadcast live on-air and has more recently been uploaded onto video-sharing sites such as YouTube by those who had been recording the programme. The incident was later blamed on a miscommunication between programme staff and stunt organisers, coupled with an unplanned last-minute change in the location from which Turner gave her report.

Transmissions

References

External links
Summer Replacements at Saturday Mornings
UP2U on Paul Morris' SatKids

1988 British television series debuts
1989 British television series endings
1980s British children's television series
BBC children's television shows
British children's television series